HMS Upstart (P65) was a Royal Navy U-class submarine built by Vickers-Armstrong.  So far she has been the only ship of the Royal Navy to bear the name Upstart. After the war, she was loaned to the Greek Navy and renamed Amfitriti.

Career

Wartime

Upstart spent most of her wartime career operating off the south coast of France, where she sank the French fishing vessels Grotte de Bethlehem and Torpille, the German auxiliary minelayer Niedersachsen (the former French Guyane) and the German merchant Tolentino (the former French Saumur).  She also launched failed attacks against the French merchant Medjerda and the Italian merchant Pascoli.

Greek service

Upstart survived the war and was loaned to the Greek Navy in 1945, where she was renamed Amfitriti.  She served with the Greek Navy for seven years, and was returned to the Royal Navy in 1952.  She was subsequently sunk as an ASDIC target off the Isle of Wight on 29 July 1959.

References

 
 
 
 

 

British U-class submarines
Ships built in Barrow-in-Furness
1942 ships
World War II submarines of the United Kingdom
British U-class submarines of the Hellenic Navy
Maritime incidents in 1959